Raghuvir Singh Meena (born 4 February 1959) is an Indian National Congress leader and  member of Congress Working Committee (CWC), the highest decision-making body of the Indian National Congress.

He is Vice President of Rajasthan Pradesh Congress Committee.

He was Member of 15th Lok Sabha. In 2009, he was elected to the Lok Sabha from Udaipur constituency in Rajasthan state. He is a former member of the Rajasthan Vidhan Sabha and a former minister in the Government of Rajasthan from 2002 to 2003.

Raghuveer Singh Meena was State president of Rajasthan Youth Congress from 1997 to 2002

Educational qualifications
Raghuveer SIngh Meena has completed his Bachelor of Arts from Vardhaman Mahaveer University, Rajasthan. He has completed his L.L.B. from University of Rajasthan.

Political career 
Raghuveer Singh Meena started his political career at a very young age and the various positions held by him during his political career were:

 1988 – Sarpanch, Gram panchayat Kharbar, Tehsil – Sarada, District–Udaipur
 1993–2008 – Elected MLA in Rajasthan Legislative Assembly from Sarada
 1995–1997 – Vice President, Rajasthan Youth Congress
 1997–2002 – President, Rajasthan Youth Congress
 2002–2003 – State Minister, Sports and Youth Affairs, Government of Rajasthan.
 2005–2011 – General Secretary, Rajasthan Pradesh Congress Committee.
 2008–2009 – MLA from Salumber.
 2009 – Elected to 15th Lok Sabha to represent Udaipur, Rajasthan.
 2012 to present – Vice President, Rajasthan Pradesh Congress Committee Rajasthan.

His role in Udaipur

Education
Udaipur a popular tourist destination has gradually transformed into an educational centre in recent years, the credit for bringing many of these institutions goes to Raghuveer Singh Meena.

Indian Institute of Management Udaipur
Raghuveer Singh Meena played a decisive role in the establishment of Indian Institute of Management (IIM) in Udaipur in 2011. As till 2008, it wasn't very sure that the prestigious IIMs would be allotted to which city of Rajasthan.  Raghuveer Meena was able to understand the necessity of bringing the IIM to Udaipur and made sure the IIM granted for Rajasthan came in the City of Lakes.

College of Fisheries
College of Fisheries, Udaipur affiliated to Maharana Pratap University of Agriculture and Technology, Udaipur was established in November 2003 by upgrading the Department of Limnology & Fisheries of Agriculture faculty. Although the college was set up in 2003, it could not get the requisite approval from the State Government. Because of the lack of approval, the university authorities have not included the college for the Joint Entrance Test (JET) in the last four years, reinforcing the suspicion that the college may meet a premature death.

Fisheries College was one of the three colleges proposed by the then vice-chancellor Prof R P Singh (April 2003-July 2004) along with a College of Horticulture and Forestry at Jhalawar and a Veterinary College at Bhinder. Except the Fisheries College, the other two colleges received approval from the state government, thanks to political patronage. The claim that the college started without its prior approval was no longer valid.

The irony is that unlike the other two colleges, the Fisheries College has got its own building and a full-fledged faculty. Vice-chancellor Shantilal Metha, while ruling out the closure of the college, at least for the time being, expressed his dissatisfaction. "How long can I run the college without the approval of the government?" he asked. According to him, the proposal for approval is still pending with the government.

The then Home minister of Rajasthan Gulab Chand Kataria, who represents the Udaipur constituency, while denying any political indifference coming in the way of getting approval for the college, put the blame on the University. "May be the university authorities have failed to convince the government of the utility of the college and not pursued the matter earnestly".

In 2009, when Raghuveer Singh Meena became M.P., he realised that fisheries can create gainful employment to the rural masses, especially for the tribals of south Rajasthan. Also that the state is abundant in water resources with high potential for inland fish production. So, the process for approval for Fisheries College was started quickly and the College of Fisheries was re-opened in 2010.

Rajiv Gandhi Tribal University
With persistent efforts by Raghuveer Singh Meena to improve the existing conditions of huge tribal population of Udaipur, this University was awarded to Udaipur in 2012 with a 20 Crore budget by the State Government.  This university is aimed to provide higher education and research facilities for the tribal population and to pay special attention to the improvement of the social, educational, economic conditions and welfare of the Scheduled tribes.

Dewas Water Project (Mohan Lal Sukhadia Water Project)
This water project aims at bringing the water from Sabarmati basin into the lakes of Udaipur. This is a 40-year-old dream project for people of Udaipur and the unique feature of this project is the water flows into the lakes with natural gravitational force without the use of electricity. This project is divided in 4 phases and were named after Mohan Lal Sukhadia, who was the pioneer of this project, by the previous Chief Minister Ashok Gehlot.

The first phase was completed in Gorana 31 years ago with the contribution of Hindustan Zinc Ltd. In this phase water flows into Sisarma river through a small tunnel and then moves on to Lake Pichola. In the second stage Akodara Dam is being constructed. An 11.05 km long tunnel will bring the water to Amarjok river near Bujhada and on to Pichola through Sisarma.
The third phase is proposed near Morwal in Padasali for which survey has been completed. Under this a dam of 500 MCAFT and a 10.38 km long tunnel is to be constructed. The last and fourth stage of the project is proposed in Ambowi in which a dam with a capacity of 500 MCAFT and a tunnel 3.88 km long will be built.

Notes

Rajasthani politicians
India MPs 2009–2014
1959 births
Living people
Lok Sabha members from Rajasthan
People from Udaipur district